The Outcast Hall Of Fame is the seventh full-length album by the Swedish/Danish band Evil Masquerade.

Track listing
All songs written by Henrik Flyman except Märk Hur Vår Skugga which was written by Carl Michael Bellman.

Personnel
Evil Masquerade
Henrik Flyman – guitar & vocals
Dennis Buhl – drums
Thor Jeppesen – bass
Artur Meinild – keyboard

Additional performers
Mats Levén – vocals
Rick Altzi – vocals
Apollo Papathanasio – vocals
Nicklas Sonne – lead vocals
Yenz Leonhardt – backing vocals

Production
Produced by Henrik Flyman.
Mixed and mastered by Tommy Hansen at Jailhouse Studios.
Paintings by David Troest.
Photos by Thomas Trane.
Artwork by Gunbarrel Offensive Design.

References

External links 

Evil Masquerade albums
2016 albums